Laptyug is a rural locality (a settlement) in Kichmegnskoye Rural Settlement, Kichmengsko-Gorodetsky District, Vologda Oblast, Russia. The population was 304 as of 2002. There are 7 streets.

Geography 
Laptyug is located 26 km northeast of Kichmengsky Gorodok (the district's administrative centre) by road. Polovishchensky is the nearest rural locality.

References 

Rural localities in Kichmengsko-Gorodetsky District